Shamoli Ray (born April 5, 1994) is a Bangladeshi competitive archer. At the 2016 Summer Olympics in Rio de Janeiro, she competed as a lone archer for the Bangladeshi team in the women's individual recurve through a tripartite invitation. There, Ray discharged a score of 600 points, 7 perfect tens, and 4 bull's eyes to take the fiftieth spot in the classification stage, before she challenged her opening round bout against the twelfth-seeded Mexican archer Gabriela Bayardo, which abruptly ended her Olympic debut in a severe 0–6 defeat.

References

External links
 
 

Bangladeshi female archers
Living people
People from Khulna District
1994 births
Archers at the 2014 Asian Games
Asian Games competitors for Bangladesh
Olympic archers of Bangladesh
Archers at the 2016 Summer Olympics
People from Narail District
Bangladeshi Hindus
South Asian Games gold medalists for Bangladesh
South Asian Games medalists in archery
Islamic Solidarity Games medalists in archery